The 2020 Utah Democratic presidential primary took place on March 3, 2020, as one of 15 contests scheduled on Super Tuesday in the Democratic Party primaries for the 2020 presidential election, following the South Carolina primary the weekend before. The Utah primary was an open primary, with any registered voter able to participate. The primary awarded 34 delegates towards the 2020 Democratic National Convention, of which 29 were pledged delegates allocated on the basis of the results of the primary.

One of his four wins on Super Tuesday, senator Bernie Sanders placed first by a large margin with around 36% of the vote and won 16 delegates, while former vice president Joe Biden came in second with around 18% and 7 delegates. Utah was the only state on Super Tuesday where Biden did not improve his result compared to pre-election polls through the endorsements of Pete Buttigieg, Amy Klobuchar and others. Senator Elizabeth Warren and former mayor Michael Bloomberg both surpassed the 15% threshold and would have won 5 delegates each, but the Utah Democratic Party decided not to calculate statewide delegates for them because of their withdrawals in the following two days.

Procedure
Utah was one of 14 states and one territory which held primaries on March 3, 2020, also known as "Super Tuesday", after the creation of a state-funded presidential primary option in a bill signed on March 22, 2017; a shift to a Super Tuesday contest by a few weeks after the signing of a bill shifting the primary date on March 27, 2019; and the confirmation that the Utah Democratic Party would opt to use the state-funded presidential primary rather than a party-run caucus as in 2016 on April 1, 2019.

Voting took place throughout the state from 7:00 a.m. until 8:00 p.m. In the primary, candidates had to meet a threshold of 15 percent at the congressional district or statewide level in order to be considered viable. The 29 pledged delegates to the 2020 Democratic National Convention were allocated proportionally on the basis of the results of the primary. Of these, between 4 and 6 were allocated to each of the state's 4 congressional districts and another 4 were allocated to party leaders and elected officials (PLEO delegates), in addition to 6 at-large delegates. The Super Tuesday primary as part of Stage I on the primary timetable received no bonus delegates, in order to disperse the primaries between more different date clusters and keep too many states from hoarding on the first shared date or on a March date in general.

After neighborhood caucuses selected delegates to county conventions in some counties on March 24, 2020 and county conventions elected delegates to the state convention between March 20, 2020 and April 4, 2020, the state convention was subsequently held from April 24 until April 25, 2020. The convention voted on national convention district delegates via delegates from a specific district, those national convention district delegates than voted on the 4 pledged PLEO delegates, and the state convention finally voted on the 6 at-large delegates for the national convention. The delegation also included 5 unpledged PLEO delegates: 4 members of the Democratic National Committee and a representative from Congress, Ben McAdams.

Candidates
The following candidates were on the ballot in Utah:

Running

Joe Biden
Michael Bloomberg
Nathan Bloxham
Roque "Rocky" De La Fuente III
Tulsi Gabbard
Bernie Sanders
Elizabeth Warren

Withdrawn

Cory Booker
Pete Buttigieg
Julian Castro
Amy Klobuchar
Deval Patrick
Tom Steyer
Marianne Williamson
Andrew Yang

Michael Bennet and Kamala Harris had been accepted as candidates but withdrew early enough so that they were not put on the ballot.

Campaign
As one of the Super Tuesday states, the state had received relatively little attention by the national media. Campaign advertising was dominated by Michael Bloomberg, whose self-funded organization flooded the airwaves with ads, and Bernie Sanders, whose organization had roots in the state and who led in the only poll that was taken in January. 

Bloomberg held a major rally in Salt Lake City on February 20, 2020 and Pete Buttigieg held one on February 17. Others may have had smaller events.

Polling

Results

Results by county

See also
 2020 Utah Republican presidential primary

Notes

References

External links
The Green Papers delegate allocation summary
Utah Democratic Party delegate selection plan

Utah Democratic
Democratic primary
2020